Tricholoma scalpturatum is a species of agaric fungus in the family Tricholomataceae. Found in Europe, it grows in a mycorrhizal association with deciduous trees including Quercus, Fagus, Tilia, and Populus, and occasionally with Pinus.

See also
List of Tricholoma species

References

scalpturatum
Fungi described in 1838
Fungi of Europe
Taxa named by Elias Magnus Fries